S/Y Joy is a 1989 Swedish drama film directed by Göran du Rées, made after the book by Inger Alfvén.

Plot
A young couple, devastated over the loss of their child in an accident, take a vacation aboard a yacht, but the wife quickly becomes obsessed with uncovering a similar tragedy that occurred on an earlier voyage.

Cast
Lena Olin as Annika Larsson
Stellan Skarsgård as Klas Larsson
Viveka Seldahl as Maja-Lena Skoog
Hans Mosesson as Herbert Skoog

Soundtrack
Style - "Dover-Calais" (Written by Tommy Ekman & Christer Sandelin)

Awards
At the 25th Guldbagge Awards, Viveka Seldahl won the award for Best Actress.

References

External links

1989 films
1989 drama films
Swedish drama films
1980s Swedish-language films
Films directed by Göran du Rées
1980s Swedish films